This is a list of Spanish television related events in 2001.

Events 
 1 January: 
 The State Society of Industrial Participations (SEPI) becomes the main shareholder of RTVE.
 TV Channel 40 Latino starts broadcasting.
 11 September: Usual programming is interrupted as a result of live broadcasting of the attacks in New York and Washington; The news program  Telediario becomes the longest running time in history.
 22 October: Talent Show Operación Triunfo becomes a real mass phenomemon in Spain.
 13 December: Castilla–La Mancha Regional TV Channel CMM TV starts broadcasting.

Debuts

Television shows

Ending this year

Foreign series debuts in Spain

Births 
 4 April - Daniel Avilés, actor.
 16 May - Carlota Boza, actress.

Deaths 
 11 March, Eugenio, comedian, 59.
 20 April, Antonio Asensio, business and former president of Antena 3, 53.
 12 May, Maruja Fernández, hostess, 76.
 14 July, Miguel Gila, comedian, 82.
 29 August, Francisco Rabal, actor, 75.
 26 October, Juan José Castillo, sport journalist , 80.
 16 November, Carlos Estrada, actor, 79.
 3 December, José Manuel Guisado "Mané", comedian and actor, 34.

See also
2001 in Spain
List of Spanish films of 2001

References 

2001 in Spanish television